December Day: Willie's Stash, Vol. 1 is a collaboration album by American country music singer-songwriter Willie Nelson and his sister, Bobbie Nelson, released by Legacy Recordings on December 2, 2014. It was the first release of Willie's Stash, a set of archival recordings curated by Nelson. Recorded with his road band, the album includes a track featuring Nelson's longtime bassist Bee Spears, deceased in 2011.

Overview
The concept of the album was inspired by the jam performances on Nelson's bus between tour dates. Nelson, who sang and played guitar was accompanied by Bobbie on a travel-size piano while on the road. Recorded at Pedernales Recordings studio, the album was produced by Buddy Cannon and engineered by Steve Chadie. The liner notes were written by Mickey Raphael. The album includes two original songs newly written by Nelson, as well as new versions of old compositions. With the addition of covers, including Irving Berlin's "Alexander's Ragtime Band" and "What'll I Do".

Release and reception

Two singles of the album were released on November 21, 2014. "Laws of Nature" was premiered on Nelson's Sirius XM channel Willie's Roadhouse, while the single and video of "Who'll Buy My Memories" was premiered on Rolling Stone Country. The entire album was premiered on New York Times' website series Press Play on November 24. The video for "Laws of Nature" was premiered by Country Weekly on November 25.

December Day was released on December 2, 2014, to generally positive reviews from music critics. At Metacritic, which assigns a normalized rating out of 100 to reviews from mainstream critics, the album received an average score of 68, based on 8 reviews. In a review for The New York Times, Nate Chinen said "from start to finish, the Nelsons’ empathetic rapport — clarified by the supple strength of a long-running band — feels both welcoming and true." Neal Spencer of The Observer applauded December Day and felt that Nelson's "worn, almost conversational" vocals "remain arresting", while his guitar playing is "idiosyncratic". Allmusic's Mark Deming called Nelson and his sister's interplay "gentle" and "intuitive", remarking it as "one of the consistent pleasures of (Nelson's) body of work." In Cuepoint, Robert Christgau was disappointed in what he felt was a lack of memorable tunes at first listen, but still viewed December Day as both a showcase for Nelson's guitar playing and a "senescence album". He praised the "Senile Dementia Suite" of songs that concludes with "Laws of Nature", which he called "inescapably tuneful". Christgau named it the eleventh best album of 2014 in his year-end list for The Barnes & Noble Review Mojo was less enthusiastic and said the record is "a pleasant, charm-filled release but no great addition to the Nelson canon", while The Boston Globe lamented the slower songs, finding them monotonous.

Personnel
Willie Nelson - lead vocals, acoustic guitar 
Bobbie Nelson - piano, B-3 organ 
Mickey Raphael - harmonica
Bee Spears - bass
Kevin Smith - bass
Billy English - drums, percussion
David Zettner - acoustic guitar

Track list

Chart performance

References

Willie Nelson albums
Legacy Recordings albums
Albums produced by Buddy Cannon
2014 albums